Aniruddha Ray (11 October 1936 - 9 December 2018) was an eminent historian of Mughal India and medieval Bengal. He was a professor of history at the Department of Islamic History and Culture in University of Calcutta.

References 

21st-century Indian historians
Academic staff of the University of Calcutta
1936 births
Living people